Attorney General McDonell may refer to:

Bob McDonnell (born 1954), Attorney General of Virginia
Michael McDonnell (1882–1956), Attorney-General of Sierra Leone
Morgan McDonnell (1824–1889), Attorney-General of Victoria